Sweeny High School is a public high school located in Sweeny, Texas (USA). It is part of the Sweeny Independent School District located in southwest Brazoria County and classified as a 4A school by the UIL. In 2015, the school was rated "Met Standard" by the Texas Education Agency.

Athletics
The Sweeny Bulldogs compete in these sports - 

Baseball
Basketball
Cross Country
Football
Golf
Powerlifting
Soccer
Softball
Tennis
Track and Field
Volleyball

State Titles

Sweeny (UIL)

Baseball - 
1985(3A)
Boys' Basketball - 
1954(1A), 1985(3A), 1987(3A), 1988(3A)
Football - 
1966(2A)
Softball - 
1996(3A)
Boys' Track - 
1992(3A)

Sweeny Carver (PVIL)

Football - 
1965(PVIL-1A)

State Finalist

Sweeny (UIL)

Girls' Basketball -  
1979(3A), 1981(3A), 1982(3A), 1983(3A), 1985(3A), 1987(3A)
Football -  
1983(3A)

Sweeny Carver (PVIL)

Boys' Basketball - 
1965(PVIL-1A)
Football  - 
1961(PVIL-1A)
Baseball -     2018(4A), 2019(4A)

Notable alumni
Cedric Woodard - NFL Defensive Tackle for the Seattle Seahawks.
Elmo Wright, NFL Wide Receiver, first to perform a touchdown celebration dance.
Tracy Simien - NFL Linebacker mainly for the Kansas City Chiefs.
Jim Lindsey, CFL Quarterback.
Johnnie Lee Higgins - NFL Wide Receiver for the Oakland Raiders.
Kevin Garrett - NFL & CFL Cornerback.
Tank Carder - NFL Linebacker for the Cleveland Browns.

References

External links
 

High schools in Brazoria County, Texas
Public high schools in Texas